In the Hindu epic Mahabharata, Vrishasena was the eldest son of the warrior Karna and his wife Vrushali. Along with his father, he fought in the Kurukshetra war from the side of the Kauravas and defeated many prominent warriors like Upapandavas, Drupada, Dhrishtadyumna, Nakula, Sahadeva, Bhima and Virata.

Kurukshetra War

During the Kurukshetra war, Karna did not take part for the first ten days due to the dispute he had with Bhishma. After Bhishma's fall on the 10th day of the war, Karna and his sons, including Vrishasena, joined the war on the 11th day and fought against the Pandavas.

11th day

On the 11th day of the war, Vrishasena overwhelmed Satanika, the son of Nakula in a single combat, and afterwards fought against the other Upapandavas and defeated them all.Then he fought against Sahadeva where he broke his bow and made him unconscious. Finally Satyaki rescued Sahadeva.

12th day 
On 12th day of war he attacked the Matsya forces of Pandava army and created havoc by defeating King Virata and wounds him badly. Seeing this Abhimanyu came in aid of Virata and a fierce duel took place between Vrishasena and Abhimanyu.Vrishasena pierced Abhimanyu's chest and his thighs with couple of arrows but finally Abhimanyu managed to break his bow and defeated him.

14th day 
On the night of the 14th day, Vrishasena engaged in a single combat against Drupada, the King of Panchala, and defeated him. Following, Drupada's defeat, he defeated Drupada's son Dhrishtadyumna commander in chief of Pandava army and made Drupada and Dhrishtadyumna to retreat.

17th day

On the 17th day of the war, Vrishasena engaged in a single combat against Nakula and destroyed his chariot. After that, Nakula mounted on Bhima's chariot, but Vrishasena continued to strike both of them, He broke Bhima's bow and pierced Bhima's chest with numerous sharp arrows. Then Bhima requested Arjuna to kill Vrishasena, and after a fierce battle, Arjuna killed him.

References 

Characters in the Mahabharata